Kabutari may refer to:
 Kabutari, Andimeshk, Khuzestan Province
 Kabutari, Ramhormoz, Khuzestan Province
 Kabutari, Kohgiluyeh and Boyer-Ahmad

See also